Capitol Shopping Centre, opened in 1993 in Altunizade neighbourhood of Üsküdar, is the first modern big shopping mall on the Asian part of Istanbul, Turkey.

Built on 6 floors and covering an area of 73,000 m², the shopping complex houses 157 retail stores, a department store and an MMM Migros supermarket, 8 movie theaters, fast food restaurants, cafeterias, bowling alley and entertainment center. It houses also Capitol Radio, a private radio station broadcasting from the complex. It has an open air and covered parking lot. Several cafes are located in the area around a huge central spring fountain.

Capitol Shopping Centre also has a movie theatre which has 14 different parts. It is one of the biggest and most modern movie theatres in Istanbul.

See also
 List of shopping malls in Istanbul
 Capitol Shopping Centre Cardiff, in Wales!

References
 From the Grand Bazaar to the modern shopping centers in Turkey. Turkish Council of Shopping Centers & Retailers (AMPD)

External links
 Official website 

Shopping malls in Istanbul
Üsküdar